Scipione di Manzano or Scipione Manzano (14 November 1560 – 26 February 1596) was an Italian poet.

Biography
He was born in Cividale del Friuli, to a local aristocratic family. He developed an interest in literature from studies in his hometown, but later in Venice. In 1594, inspired by Torquato Tasso's work, he published an epic poem about Doge Enrico Dandolo's Sack of Constantinople in 1202. His best known work, published posthumously, is an epic poem Aci: favola marina, about the love story between Acis and the nymph Galatea.

References

External links 
 

1560 births
1596 deaths
16th-century Italian poets
16th-century male writers
16th-century Italian writers